More Than Murder is a 1984 American made-for-television mystery film starring Stacy Keach as Mickey Spillane's iconic hardboiled private detective Mike Hammer. It aired on January 26, 1984, at 9:00 p.m. and was the second of two pilots featuring Keach in the part - the other being Murder Me, Murder You (1983) - that blazed a path for the 1980s version of the CBS series Mickey Spillane's Mike Hammer, which debuted on January 28, 1984.

Plot
When his longtime friend Captain Pat Chambers is wounded in a drug bust and arrested as an accessory to drug trafficking, private detective Mike Hammer vows to help him clear his name. Assistant District Attorney Barrington dislikes Hammer and believes that Chambers is guilty.

Reception
In review printed in The New York Times on January 27, 1984, John J. O'Connor wrote, "Mr. Keach has cultivated a perfect kind of New York-seedy look. His suit nearly always needs pressing, and his hat is inevitably worn at a jaunty angle. And most of his lines are delivered with a low-keyed snarl." O'Connor concluded, "Is this supposed age of liberation ready for an unrepentant male chauvinist pig? Network television seems to think so."

In the book Mickey Spillane on Screen: A Complete Study of the Television and Film Adaptations by Max Allan Collins and James L. Traylor, the authors state that More Than Murder "has an episodic TV approach that makes it a lesser film than its predecessor."

Home media
After almost 25 years, More Than Murder was released on DVD by Sony Pictures as the second disc of a two-DVD set also featuring the 1983 TV movie Murder Me, Murder You.

References

External links
 

1980s mystery films
1984 television films
1984 films
American detective films
American mystery films
CBS network films
Films about the illegal drug trade
Films based on American novels
Films based on works by Mickey Spillane
Films directed by Gary Nelson
Films set in New York City
1980s English-language films
1980s American films
Mike Hammer (character) films